The following is a list of notable shakuhachi and hotchiku players, arranged by surname.

B 
 Christopher Yohmei Blasdel
 Cornelius Boots (Cornelius Shinzen Boots)

D 
 Watazumi Doso

E 
 Douglas Ewart

I 
 Yoshikazu Iwamoto

J 
 Phil Nyokai James

K 
 Kaoru Kakizakai
 Daisuke Kaminaga
 Masayuki Koga
 Kinko Kurosawa

L 
 Ken LaCosse
 Riley Lee

M 
 Kōhachiro Miyata
 Minoru Muraoka

O 
 Atsuya Okuda

R 
 Randy Raine-Reusch
 Alcvin Ramos
 Brian Ritchie (Brian Tairaku Ritchie)
 Rodrigo Rodriguez
 Ned Rothenberg

S 

 James Nyoraku Schlefer
 Ronnie Nyogetsu Reishin Seldin
 Ikkyū Sōjun

Y 
 Gorō Yamaguchi
 Hōzan Yamamoto
 Katsuya Yokoyama
 Masakazu Yoshizawa

See also 
 Shakuhachi

References

External links 
 Shakuhachi players, makers, composers, etc.

Shakuhachi players